Sulyayevsky is a rural locality (a khutor) and the administrative center of Sulyayevskoye Rural Settlement, Kumylzhensky District, Volgograd Oblast, Russia. The population was 682 as of 2010. There are 18 streets.

Geography 
Sulyayevsky is located in forest steppe, on Khopyorsko-Buzulukskaya Plain, on the bank of the Kumylga River, 25 km north of Kumylzhenskaya (the district's administrative centre) by road. Tyurinsky is the nearest rural locality.

References 

Rural localities in Kumylzhensky District